MTM Enterprises (also known as MTM Productions) was an American independent production company established in 1969 by Mary Tyler Moore and her then-husband Grant Tinker to produce The Mary Tyler Moore Show for CBS. The name for the production company was drawn from Moore's initials.

MTM produced a number of successful television programs during the 1970s and 1980s. The company's mascot was an orange Tabby cat named Mimsie who appeared in their logo (who was borrowed from a local shelter and then owned by one of the MTM staff, not by Moore and Tinker, who named the cat), inside a circle surrounded by gold ribbons, parodying how Leo the Lion is presented in the Metro-Goldwyn-Mayer logo.

All of MTM's shows are now owned by The Walt Disney Company through its subsidiary, 20th Television.

History
For many years, MTM and CBS co-owned the CBS Studio Center in Studio City, California, where a majority of their programs were filmed and videotaped. Most of MTM's programs aired on CBS. In 1971, co-founder Grant Tinker was forced to quit 20th Century-Fox Television due to conflicts with how to run MTM, in order to maintain a full-time job at the company. In 1976, MTM teamed up with Metromedia Producers Corporation to start a variety show, a first for first-run syndication.

Tinker oversaw MTM's operation until leaving the company in 1981 and becoming chairman of NBC. Lawyers backing NBC's then-owner RCA convinced Tinker to sell his remaining shares of MTM. Moore and Arthur Price, her business manager and company vice president, bought Tinker's shares; Price subsequently was elevated to president. Tinker later regretted leaving MTM, believing that the company started to decline without him.

In 1986, MTM launched its own syndicated arm MTM Television Distribution, to handle off-net syndication of the MTM shows, and subsequently courted to continue its relations with syndicator Jim Victory to sell off-network rights to MTM's shows like Hill Street Blues and WKRP in Cincinnati, all the way up until the late 1980s as part of a contract settlement. In 1988, MTM was sold to UK broadcaster and independent station for the South and South East of England TVS Entertainment for $320 million.

After TVS lost its franchise to broadcast on the ITV network to Meridian Broadcasting, a number of American companies (and to a lesser extent, Meridian) were interested in acquiring MTM, with Pat Robertson's International Family Entertainment making the first offer. A small number of shareholders, including Julian Tregar, rejected the offer from IFE. In November, TCW Capital made a bid, but withdrew it a few weeks later after reviewing the accounts of TVS. IFE increased its offer to £45.3M, but continued to be opposed by Julian Tregar, who blocked the deal on technical grounds, alleging that the offer was too low. IFE finally increased the offer to appease the remaining shareholders, and on January 23, 1993, their offer of £56.5M was finally accepted. The deal went into effect on February 1, 1993 (the month after Meridian began its first broadcast).

In 1995, Michael Ogiens, formerly running CBS, as well as his production company Ogiens/Kane Company, joined MTM to serve as president of the company in hopes that MTM would be restored to its independent production glory. The following year, Josh Kane, fellow partner of the Ogiens/Kane Company joined MTM as vice president for the East Coast offices. In 1997, MTM hit layoffs at the syndication unit after the cancellation of the show The Cape.

In 1997, International Family Entertainment was sold to News Corporation, and folded into its subsidiary Fox Kids Worldwide, eventually renamed to Fox Family Worldwide (a joint venture between Fox and Saban Entertainment). MTM's library assets however, were transferred over to 20th Television who retained them, even after Fox Family Worldwide was sold to The Walt Disney Company in 2001. The Pretender and Good News were both the last surviving shows to be produced by MTM. While Good News was cancelled in 1998 (when MTM ceased operations), The Pretender continued its run until 2000, as 20th Television inherited the show in 1997 (when News Corporation purchased MTM). MTM's library became property of Disney following its acquisition of 20th Century Fox in 2019.

MTM Enterprises also included a record label, MTM Records — distributed by Capitol Records — which was in existence from 1984 to 1988.

Television

CBS connection
MTM programs appeared almost exclusively on CBS until the early 1980s, when Grant Tinker assumed the additional role of president of NBC. Soon, NBC picked up a number of MTM shows, and Tinker stepped down as head of MTM to avoid a conflict of interest. His intention was to leave NBC after 5 years (in 1986) and return to MTM, taking over the reins from interim MTM president Arthur Price. However, Price fired many of the key players in the company's ranks, and by 1986 they had few shows left on the schedules (Hill Street Blues, St. Elsewhere and Remington Steele were all nearing the ends of their runs, leaving Newhart as the sole entrant on the schedule).

Mimsie the Cat
Mimsie the Cat (1968 - ) was a live-action tabby cat seen in the MTM Enterprises logo, in a spoof of Metro-Goldwyn-Mayer's long-running Leo the Lion mascot.

In the standard version of the logo, as first used on The Mary Tyler Moore Show, Mimsie appears in a crouched position, looks up at the camera, and meows once. Mimsie would not meow for the camera crew, so they eventually used footage of her yawning, run in reverse, with the sound effect added.

By the 1980s, there were many different variants of the logo, with Mimsie often appearing in different "costumes", as well as being replaced by other cats, corresponding to the style and theme of the particular programs. 
 On The Mary Tyler Moore Show episode, "Today I am a Ma’am.", Mimsie did a higher-pitched and rather shrill meow, and on the episode "Put on a Happy Face", Moore herself was shown stating the Looney Tunes end line, "That's All Folks!", a line spoken by Mary Richards during that episode.
 For the detective series Remington Steele, a Sherlock Holmes-esque stalking cap and pipe (that fell out of Mimsie's mouth when she meowed) were added. 
 Bay City Blues had an animated version of Mimsie wearing a baseball hat and baseball glove and catching a baseball and meowing. 
 Lou Grant, Paris, Just Between Friends and “Something for Joey” showed a still image of Mimsie. 
 For the blooper reel of Lou Grant, Mimsie chirps like a bird.
 The White Shadow featured a different black-and-white cat bouncing an orange basketball; an extended version of The White Shadow variant can be seen on rare prints of the pilot, featuring the logo animating and the cat watching the ball fall off-screen. 
 Hill Street Blues put a police uniform hat onto Mimsie's head, stating a reference to the TV show.
 St. Elsewhere showed her in a surgical mask and scrubs. Two episodes of the TV show feature a different meow soundtrack.
 Graham Kerr put a chef's hat onto Mimsie's head. She would sometimes meow twice.
 The Texas Wheelers, aka Texas Wheelers had a black-and-white kitten near a water pipe, looking around and meowing. The final episode had an animated version of a kitten staggering from behind a wagon wheel and collapsing. 
 For Carlton Your Doorman, the logo is drawn animation-like and Carlton's cat Ringo is seen and says off-screen, “Come on, meow!”. When Ringo doesn't meow, Carlton mutters "Damn cat...".
 Xuxa had Mimsie say "Tchau!”, which means "goodbye" in Portuguese. In the Pilot the logo Had children Cheering for Xuxa And Fades Out And Mimsie Meows
 A Little Sex featured an animated gray cat joining an animated version of Mimsie. After Mimsie meowed, the two cats purr by rubbing their faces at themselves.
 Newhart kept the original, unadorned footage, but replaced (except for the series pilot) the meowing sound effect with Bob Newhart's voice-over of "meow" in his trademark deadpan style, and in the series finale featured Mimsie yelling “QUIET!", uttered by Darryl & Darryl (their first and only word).
 The Duck Factory had (right on the credits) feature an off-screen voice say “Where's the cat?”, “Here’s the cat.”, or “Take it, cat!”, and then used the original footage, replacing Mimsie's meow with a "Quack!"
 In the series finale of St. Elsewhere, Mimsie (possibly portrayed by another cat) is shown unconscious and dying on-screen, connected to an IV, a heart monitor and medical equipment; as the credits roll the heart monitor beeps and then as the credits end the heart monitor flatlines marking the end of St. Elsewhere and Mimsie's death. Coincidentally, Mimsie died shortly after the airing of this episode at the age of 20. Syndicated copies of this episode replace this variant with the normal credits.
 WKRP in Cincinnati featured Mimsie saying “Ooooooh!”
 The Steve Allen Show had Mimsie wearing Allen’s sunglasses and says “Schmock!”.
 Vampire had the MTM text all in dark red, and Mimsie is nowhere to be seen. Due to this, the "T" is in its normal size.
 In 2013, an episode of Hot in Cleveland titled "Love is All Around", which starred Betty White and featured Georgia Engel, did an MTM reunion with Moore, Valerie Harper, and Cloris Leachman. At the end of the episode the camera pans to a similar-looking cat in the window, giving Mimsie’s final meow in a homage to the company's logo.
 Mary Tyler Moore Show 20th anniversary had mimsie say *Bye* voiced by Mary Tyler

References

External links
 MTM Enterprises records — at the Wisconsin Center for Film and Theater Research.

 
Television production companies of the United States
Film production companies of the United States
Disney acquisitions
Entertainment companies based in California
Entertainment companies established in 1969
Mass media companies established in 1969
Mass media companies disestablished in 1998
1969 establishments in California
1998 disestablishments in California
Defunct companies based in Greater Los Angeles
Walt Disney Studios (division)
The Walt Disney Company subsidiaries
1997 mergers and acquisitions
Former News Corporation subsidiaries